Alan Baker (born 1958) is British poet. He has been the editor of the poetry publisher Leafe Press since 2000, and the online magazine Litter since 2005.

Life

Baker was born in Newcastle upon Tyne, England, in 1958, and in 1985 he moved to Nottingham, where he still lives. In the late 1990s he encountered the email discussion group British-poets, which introduced him to the poets associated with the British Poetry Revival. He founded Leafe Press in 2000, and is now co-editor (with American poet John Bloomberg-Rissman) and is editor of its associated webzine Litter. Leafe Press has published work by Kelvin Corcoran, Carrie Etter, Geraldine Monk, and Lee Harwood, among others, and more recently, work by American, French and Mexican poets, and by the Moroccan Abdellatif Laâbi.

Poetry

Baker published a series of poetry pamphlets between 1999 and 2009; in 2008, Bamboo Books published his translation of Yves Bonnefoy's Début et Fin de la Neige, and in 2011 Skysill Press published Variations on Painting a Room: Poems 2000–2010, which brought together all of Baker's small press work to date, along with a considerable amount of new work.  Baker's poetry is regarded as being non-mainstream, or experimental, and is also seen as both lyrical and political.  He has an interest in prose-poetry, and his prose sequence The Book of Random Access mixes the apparently personal with borrowed texts, and with references to Eastern philosophies in what has been described as a "post-modern pilgrimage". Baker's poetry and prose poetry "draws on array of modernist and post-modernist techniques". In some of his poetry 'repetition, or near-repetition, are frequently employed in a way that re-enacts the routines of everyday life... half-glimpsed or half-grasped.'.

In 2018, Red Ceilings Press published Baker's sequence of prose-poems, "Letters from the Underworld" which "...alludes to Dante's Inferno, but the hell from which the narrator writes is a region of airports, ferries, taxis and hotels". In 2019 Knives, Forks and Spoons Press published "Riverrun", a sequence of post-modern sonnets about the river Trent. These poems provide "a set of reflections on the impossibility of containing the river within a narrative schema ... the river remains a tangible presence throughout the work".

Bibliography

Poetry
The Causeway, (1999 Leafe Press)
Not Bondi Beach (2002, Leafe Press)
The Strange City (2006, Secretariat Books)
The World Seen from the Air (2007, Skysill Press)
Hotel February (2009, Bamboo Books, USA)
Variations on Painting a Room: Poems 2000–2010 (2011, Skysill Press)
All This Air and Matter (2013, Oystercatcher Press)
Whether (2014, Knives Forks and Spoons Press)
Rimas y Ritmos (2017, Facquesol Books) 
Letters from the Underworld (2018, Red Ceilngs Press)
Riverrun (2019, Knives Forks and Spoons Press)
A Journal of Enlightened Panic (2020, Shoestring Press)

Translations
The Beginning and End of the Snow / Début et fin de la neige by Yves Bonnefoy (2008, Leafe/Bamboo Books)
Little Things / Les Petites Choses by Abdellatif Laâbi (2013, Leafe Press)

Anthologies
The Nottingham Collection (2005, Five Leaves Press)
Gathered Here Today: a celebration of Geraldine Monk at 60 (2012, Knives, Forks and Spoons Press). 
Twitters for a Lark (Poetry of the European Union of Imaginary Authors), Robert Sheppard (ed.), Shearsman Books. 
The Other Room Anthology 10, Davies, Jenks, Thurston (eds), The Other Room Press.

References

Notes
 Gaze, Julia (2012), "Review of 'Variations on Painting a Room'". Assent (University of Derby), Issue 65/1, .
 Merritt, Matt (2012), "The Page of Now", Under the Radar, Issue 9, February 2012, .
 Miller, Kate (2012), "Change, Return, Success". Poetry Salzburg Review. No. 22. Autumn 2012. .
 Riley, Peter (2012), "Poetry Notes: Books Received Summer 2012", Fortnightly Review.
 Seed, Ian (2011), "Space and Play" review of Variations on Painting a Room: Poems 2000–2010, Stride Magazine.
 Spence, Steve (2012), "Playful and Curious", Stride Magazine.
 Swift, Todd (2009), Introduction to poem by Alan Baker, Eyewear.
 Bell, Kathleen (2019), "Under the Radar", issue 23. ISSN 1758-3357.
 Collings, Simon (2019), "Tears in the Fence", Issue 69. ISSN 0266-5816.

External links
 Leafe Press website
 Litter Magazine

1958 births
20th-century English male writers
20th-century English poets
21st-century British poets
21st-century English male writers
Living people
Writers from Newcastle upon Tyne